Berim is a mountain in Kosovo, which is part of Mokra Gora. It is in the municipality of Zubin Potok. From its peak parts of Gazivoda Lake can be seen.

Notes

References

Mountains of Kosovo